Karlo Calcina Zúñiga (born 3 March 1984) is a Peruvian footballer who plays as a midfielder for FBC Melgar in the Torneo Descentralizado.

Club career
Karlo Calcina developed as a footballer in Sporting Cristal. Later his debut in the Torneo Descentralizado came in 2004 with Atlético Universidad. He also scored his first goal in the top-flight in the 4–1 home win over Cienciano for round 22 of the Clausura.

He joined FBC Melgar in January 2006 for his first spell with club.

International career
Calcina played for the Peru U17 side making his debut in a 1–1 draw against Argentina in 2001.

References

1984 births
Living people
People from Arequipa
Peruvian footballers
Atlético Universidad footballers
FBC Melgar footballers
Cobresol FBC footballers
Peruvian Primera División players
Association football midfielders
FBC Melgar managers
Peruvian football managers